International Superstar Soccer Deluxe, known as Jikkyou World Soccer 2: Fighting Eleven in Japan and also known as ISS Deluxe, is a football video game and the sequel to International Superstar Soccer developed and published by Konami. The Deluxe version was published first to the SNES in 1995, then the Mega Drive in 1996 (developed by Factor 5) and finally the PlayStation in 1997.

The game features 16 different formations, and 8 strategies, and includes 36 national sides. However, all players have fictitious names, due to a lack of official licensing.

Game Modes 
There are 6 different game modes. While there is no game saving function, there is a password system that allows the player to restore a previous game.

Open Game: A friendly match against a human player or the CPU with the option to choose a stadium, weather conditions, player's handicap, number of players on the pitch and the skill level of the goal keeper. It is also possible to spectate a CPU vs CPU match.

There's a "Short League" mode where you can play in a 24-team mini-league, and a "Short Tournament" with 64 teams competing in a knockout tournament.

International Cup: a World Cup mode starting from a regional qualifying round.

European Cup: a Euro Cup mode starting from a regional qualifying round.

World Series: a 48 teams league playing home and away.

Scenario: 12 scenarios recreating historical matches. The game starts during the match in different conditions, and the player has to defend the result or make a comeback depending on the difficulty level.

Penalty Kicks: the standard 5 penalty kicks mode with sudden death if both teams are tied.

Training: there are 3 different training modes; free training where you can try the game controls on the pitch, free kick training and corner kick training. There's also a "challenge mode" where you can beat records in different skills.

Gameplay 
The game contains eight different stadiums, and all vary in the material of the pitch and the surrounding décor, and are all of different sizes. The game can be played in many weather conditions. Below is a list of the different dimensions of the eight national stadiums in-game:

: 82 x 118 (yards) 74.62 x 107.38 (meters)
: 90 x 126 (yards) 81.9 x 114.61 (meters)
: 82 x 132 (yards) 74.62 x 120.12 (meters)
: 82 x 122 (yards) 74.62 x 111 (meters)
: 74 x 122 (yards) 67.34 x 111 (meters)
: 90 x 114 (yards) 81.9 x 103.74 (meters)
: 90 x 138 (yards) 81.9 x 125.58 (meters)
: 74 x 114 (yards) 67.34 x 103.74 (meters)

The game also contains 36 national teams in groups of 6 based on their region
Europe 1                     

                                      
                 

Europe 2

Europe 3

Europe 4

Asia-Africa

North/South America

Scenario
Besides friendly matches and tournaments, the player could also choose the Scenario mode, where they would resume a game with his team either losing and tying to win it within the few time left on the clock. The matches in the Scenario mode were heavily influenced by real matches with similar score.

1)  vs  1-2 (Time remaining 1:14 - Italy's free kick)
It seems like a defeat for ITALY against the talented CROATIA. ITALY scored a goal in the second half. Now they are trying to turn the tables around. This references to Italy's defeat against Croatia on November 16, 1994 during a Euro 96 qualifier played in Palermo. 

2)  vs  2-3 (Time remaining 1:02 - Germany's free kick)
Although GERMANY had a 2 goals lead, the gave BULGARIA a penalty, and now they are behind by a goal. BULGARIA is a dangerous team to handle. This references to the Bulgarians defeating the Germans in Sofia on June 7, 1995 with a score of 3-2. On November 15, 1995 the match in Berlin ended 3-1.

3)  vs  1-3 (Time remaining 1:54 - England's corner kick)
It's ENGLAND, the home of football, against the champions, BRAZIL. ENGLAND can not end the game as it is, for the sake of their pride. This scenario references to England's loss to Brazil in the Umbro Cup.

4)  vs  0-0 (Time remaining 0:56 - Germany's free kick)
GERMANY cannot score a goal against ITALY, even though the ITALIANS are playing poorly. GERMANY wants to turn the tables with this free kick. This references to a 1-1 Draw in the Euro 1988.

5)  vs  1-1 (Time remaining 0:49 - Sweden's throw in)
TURKEY is doing extremely well against SWEDEN, who have been playing with their best team. One more goal for a historical win. This references to Turkey defeating the Swedes 2-1 in the Euro 96 qualifier. Match played on March 29, 1995.

6)  vs  1-1 (Time remaining 0:42 - Belgium's free kick)
In the last game when they faced each other, BELGIUM were soundly beaten. Although many key players are out, this time they want to make it even. This references to Belgium's tie versus Spain in a Euro 96 qualifier. Match played in Seville on March 29, 1995. On December 17, 1994 Spain won away for 1-4.

7)  vs  0-1 (Time remaining 1:43 - Romania's free kick)
ROMANIA is in good conditions. Even though they have let POLAND take the lead, there is plenty of time to turn it around. This references to the qualifier for the Euro 96 where Romania would go on to win 2-1. Match played on March 29, 1995.

8)  vs  0-0 (Time remaining 1:24 - Scotland's goal kick)
SCOTLAND is eager a ticket to ENGLAND for the finals. The most important thing to do is defeat RUSSIA right now. This references to a Euro 96 qualifier which ended 0-0. Match played in Moscow on March 29, 1995. On November 16, 1994 the match in Glasgow ended 1-1.

9)  vs  0-1 (Time remaining 0:38 - Portugal's free kick)
PORTUGAL have regained their old strong form. But they have just conceded an own goal. Concentrate and you may yet win. This references to Portugal's loss against Ireland in a qualifier for the Euro 96. Match played in Dublin on April 26, 1995. On November 15, 1995 the match in Lisbon ended 3-0.

10)  vs  2-2 (Time remaining 0:49 - Argentina's corner kick)
BRAZIL are strong. They seem like they can score from anywhere. But his is for the South American championship, so ARGENTINA must fight back. This references to many matches. The last one was the Quarter-Final in the 1995 Copa America, where Argentina would go on to lose 4-2 on penalties. Match played in Rivera on July 17, 1995.

11)  vs  1-3 (Time remaining 1:38 - Holland's free kick)
HOLLAND’S defence has been shattered in the second half. Unless their offende starti something, the have no choice but to lose. This references to a Euro 96 qualifier were Holland lost the match 3-1. match played in Prague on April 26, 1995. On November 16, 1994 the match in Rotterdam ended 0-0.

12)  vs  1-1 (Time remaining 0:02 - England's corner kick)
Unbelievably, ENGLAND conceded a goal to a country from ASIA. It will be just a losing if the game ends in a tie. This references to a match of the Umbro Cup where England would go on to win 2-1.

Reception

Reviewing the Super NES version, Computer and Video Games rated it 91% and said the "best soccer game on the Super NES has been improved" and it is "an essential buy for fans of fast, fun footy."

Videohead of GamePro rated the SNES version 4 out of 5, saying "it "ain't FIFA, but it's a respectable game" that "brings solid play to the match" and which soccer fans should appreciate. He said the game has easy controls with a short learning curve, but that manual goalie control is difficult and high kicks tend to send the ball off-screen due to the large sprites and close-in side view. He praised the announcer's voice and crowd chants.

Next Generation reviewed the Super NES version of the game, rating it three stars out of five, and stated that "Overall, this particular stab at the Soccer genre is slightly above average, but not by much." 

In 1996, GamesMaster ranked the SNES version 8th on their "The GamesMaster SNES Top 10." In the same issue, they also ranked the game 34th in its "Top 100 Games of All Time."

References

External links
 
 The Guardian "The Beautiful Game" – Round-up of retro (or "old school") soccer video games, with a mini-review of ISS Deluxe on the SNES.

1995 video games
Video games with AI-versus-AI modes
International Superstar Soccer
PlayStation (console) games
Sega Genesis games
Super Nintendo Entertainment System games
Video games developed in Germany
Video games developed in Japan
Video games with oblique graphics
Factor 5 games
Multiplayer and single-player video games